, also known by his Chinese style name , was a bureaucrat of Ryukyu Kingdom.

Takehara Anshitsu was born to an aristocrat family called Mō-uji Misato Dunchi. He was the eldest son of Takehara Anshun. He succeeded as the head of Mō-shi Misato Dunchi in 1792, and was given Misato magiri (modern a part of Uruma), which was the hereditary fief of his family in the same year.

He served as a member of Sanshikan from 1798 to 1811.

References

Ueekata
Sanshikan
People of the Ryukyu Kingdom
Ryukyuan people
18th-century Ryukyuan people
19th-century Ryukyuan people
1756 births
1811 deaths